"This Is for Real" is a song by the pop punk band Motion City Soundtrack. It was digitally released on August 7, 2007, and physically released on September 3, 2007 in the United Kingdom. The song impacted radio on September 25, 2007.

Music video
The music video, directed by Jay Martin, features the band playing in a bowling alley. In addition to performing the song as Motion City Soundtrack, each band member, except for Pierre, plays as a different character that appears in the video. Johnson plays an old man, Taylor plays a Boy Scout, Cain plays a biker, and Thaxton plays as a man with an '80s style mullet. The video was officially released by the band on September 10, 2007, on mtvU.com.

Trivia
A portion of the song is also featured on an AMC commercial advertising its annual "Monsterfest" 10-day special.
The song was released into the Singstar Singstore on 12 December.
The song was also featured in the trailer for the film 17 Again starring Zac Efron that came out 17 April 2009.
The bass guitar is a Fender Japanese Jaguar Hot Rod Red Bass.

Track listing
CD
 "This Is for Real"
 "Plymouth Rock (Lifter Puller cover)"

CD 2
 "This Is for Real"
 "Not Asking You to Leave"

AU CD
 "This Is for Real"
 "Not Asking You to Leave"
 "Plymouth Rock (Lifter Puller cover)"

iTunes download
 "This Is for Real"
 "Broken Heart" (Acoustic)

Download
 "This Is for Real"
 "The Worst Part..."

Charts

References

External links
Evenifitkillsme.tv
Epitaph Records Artist Page

2007 singles
2007 songs
Motion City Soundtrack songs
Songs written by Joshua Cain
Songs written by Justin Pierre
Epitaph Records singles